Oxford University Dancesport Club (OUDC) is Oxford University's largest sports club and is the second largest club at the university after the Oxford Union. Founded in 1968 it currently has an annual membership of around 800 members. It runs professionally taught classes in the following dance styles:
Ballroom
Latin American
Salsa
Argentine Tango
Bachata
Rock’n’Roll
Zumba

Its classes are open to all (including non-university members) and cater to all levels of experience. The Club also runs occasional workshops and a weekly social dance on Sundays in full term and on some Sundays out of term.

History
Prior to the establishment of the Oxford Ballroom Dancing Club (OBDC), (later OUBDC and still later OUDC) undergraduates at the University of Oxford were not allowed to attend the popular Brett's dancing school in the centre of Oxford, nor attend any public dance at the Carfax Assembly Rooms, Headington Hill Hall or Town Hall. Private dancing lessons were also not permitted. In a bid to provide students at the university with an opportunity to dance a meeting was held on Wednesday 8 May 1968 at the Iffley Road Stadium for all those interested in forming a ballroom dancing club. This first meeting was attended by just over 50 people.

The Club's first coach was Anne O’Hagan, assisted by Lexa Duckett, with the Club's first Senior Member, Dr. Acheson, and his wife helping out where possible. The Club received its University accreditation in 1969 and by 1971 had 143 members. Initially it was a purely social dancing club – it was only later that it started running medals examinations and competitions.
The first competition in Oxford was held at Rhodes House on 8 March 1974. The competition was against Cambridge and Oxford won the competition by 106.5pts to 106pts. The judges were the Tanakas, an eminent ballroom dance couple who represented Japan. The two teams have been rivals ever since.
 Oxford won its first Inter Varsity Dance Competition in 1980, a year after Cambridge won their first such competition. The Club was awarded Full Blue status for women in 1997 and discretionary Full Blue status for men in 2003.

Team
The Club's Main Team is one of the most successful university dancesport teams in the country. The Team, which usually consists of 24 couples, competes at a number of university circuit dancesport competitions during the year, including the Inter Varsity Dance Competition (IVDC) and is the reigning Inter Varsity Dance champion. In 2004 and again in 2006 it won the Intercontinental Dance Festival team match competition, a title it still holds as the competition has not been run since that date.

Each year the Team competes in a Varsity dancesport competition against Cambridge . This consists of an A-Team match, a B-Team match, a Beginners Team match and a variety of other open events. Oxford and Cambridge take it in turns to host the event. Both the A-Team (Varsity) match and the B-Team (Challenge Shield) match are contested by 9 couples from each university. Each University splits its nine couples into three groups of three couples. Each of these groups of three couples then dances against each of the three groups from the other university in each of the four dances (waltz, quickstep, cha and jive). The results from each of these nine group-to-group matches for each of the four dances are then added together to determine the winning team. The Varsity and Challenge Shield match format is extremely unusual as it requires dancers to be good at both ballroom and Latin American style dances.

Coaches

Bruce Richardson 
Bruce Richardson is the Club's Head Coach. As such he has ultimate responsibility for all coaching within the Club (including the employment of other coaching staff) and for all trials and selections for the Team and Beginners Team. Bruce, who was trained by ballroom dancer Guy Howard (author of the IDTA Ballroom Technique book), has been the Club's ballroom coach for many years and has a considerable record of success in university dancesport. Teams selected by Bruce have been victorious at the Inter Varsity Dance Competition on 11 occasions in his 40 years of head coach. In 2009 he reached the shortlist of three for the Ballroom, Latin and Sequence Teachers Award at the Carl Alan Awards after being nominated by his peers in recognition of the longevity of his coaching.

Former coaches 
Former coaches include Ian Waite.

OUDC have employed many prestigious dancers to coach over the years, as well as numerous workshops with top professionals.

Cuppers
The Club runs an annual inter-college dancesport competition called Cuppers. Colleges enter teams of four couples. Each couple performs one of four dances: waltz, quickstep, cha and jive. The highest scoring team wins their college the Acheson Shield. The College with the most points overall across all of the teams they enter takes home the Rob Stevens Memorial Cup. The rules of the competition require that at least one member of each partnership must be an ‘inexperienced dancer’. Hence, the success of a college depends as much on the beginners it recruits as on its established dancers.

Results

Inter Varsity Dance Competition

Oxford Cambridge Dancesport Varsity match

A Team

(+) indicates that this couple was also best overall across Oxford and Cambridge in their respective category.

B Team

Acheson Shield

Rob Stevens Memorial Trophy
This trophy was awarded for the first time in 2010.

Notes

External links
 Oxford University Dancesport Club Website

Dancesport
Dancesport in the United Kingdom
1968 establishments in England
Sports clubs established in 1968